The ZIS-101 was a limousine produced by the Soviet car manufacturer Zavod Imeni Stalina. It was introduced in 1936. Its chassis was reverse-engineered from a Buick 33-90, except for the front suspension, engine, exhaust and battery carried over from 1933 experimental limousine L-1, itself an unlicensed Buick 32-90 copy, but the body was designed by Budd Company for whopping $1,500,000 while the stamps were made by Hamilton Foundry & Machine Company for another $500,000. The car was fitted with a 3-speed manual gearbox.

Production ended in 1941 with over 8,000 cars built.

In 1939, a two-seat sport version designed by Valentin Nikolaevich Rostkov called 101-Sport was built. It was, however, not made in more than one or two copies.

Variants
 ZIS-101: Initial production version. Produced 1936–1939.
 ZIS-101A: ZIS-101 with improved engine. Produced 1939–1941.
 ZIS-101B: Improved ZIS-101, prototype.
 ZIS-101C: Ambulance version.
 ZIS-101 Sport: Two-seat version. Produced in 1939.
 ZIS-102: Convertible version. Produced 1938–1940.

References

Cars of Russia
Cars introduced in 1936
1940s cars
ZiL vehicles
Luxury vehicles
Sports cars
Soviet automobiles
Flagship vehicles
First car made by manufacturer